Nicola Vicars Coghill (born 4 January 1964) is an Australian actress. She is best known for playing the roles of Sister Jackie Crane in The Flying Doctors, and Miranda Parker in Neighbours.

Career
Coghill was born in Melbourne. She has appeared in many Australian television series and movies. Her television roles include:

In 2007, Coghill joined the cast of long-running Australian soap Neighbours, as Miranda Parker, who is the wife of Steve Parker, and the mother of Bridget Parker and Riley Parker. In 2009, Coghill, as well as Eloise Mignon and Steve Bastoni, made public that they were leaving Neighbours.

Filmography

Filmography

FILM

Television

Personal life
Nikki Coghill has two daughters and lives in Melbourne with her husband.

References

External links

1964 births
Australian television actresses
Living people
Actresses from Melbourne